Royale may refer to:

Places 
 Île Royale, an island in the Atlantic Ocean off the coast of French Guiana
 Île Royale, a former name of Cape Breton Island, Canada 
 Isle Royale, an island in Lake Superior
 Rue Royale, several streets

Arts, entertainment, and media
 Clash Royale, a strategy game by Supercell
 "The Royale", an episode from the second season of Star Trek: The Next Generation

Foods
 Custard Royale, a kind of savory custard
 Hamburger Royale or McRoyale, the name of Quarter Pounder in some countries with the metric system

Transportation

Motor vehicles
 Royale, a variant line of the Oldsmobile 88 automobile
 Bugatti Royale, a luxury automobile
 Daewoo Royale, an automobile manufactured by Daewoo Motors
 Ford Royale, an automobile manufactured by Autolatina in Brazil
 Holden Royale, several different automobiles manufactured by Holden
 REO Motor Car Company, a defunct automobile manufacturer founded by Ransom E. Olds
 Royale Racing Cars, a defunct racecar constructor
 Stutz Royale, a limousine produced by the Stutz Motor Car of America in the 1970s or 1980s
 Vauxhall Royale, a rebadged Opel Senator automobile
 Vauxhall Royale Coupé, a rebadged Opel Monza

Other transportation
 MS Royale, a cruise ship operated by several companies, last known as SS Seabreeze
 Royale Airlines, a now defunct small commercial airline

Other uses
 Royale (brand), a Canadian household paper products brand
 Banque Royale, former name of the Banque de France
 Energy Blue, a GUI theme for Windows XP Media Center edition also known as Royale
 La Royale, nickname for the French Navy
 Royale grind, a type of Aggressive Inline Skating grind
 Tillandsia 'Royale', a hybrid cultivar
 Latrice Royale, American drag queen

See also
 Battle Royale (disambiguation)
 Casino Royale (disambiguation)
 Royal (disambiguation)